A Sceptic's Universe is the debut and sole album by Norwegian progressive metal band Spiral Architect. It was recorded and mixed by Neil Kernon.

Track listing

Japanese bonus track: 
"Prelude to Ruin" (Fates Warning cover) (07:34)

Personnel
 Øyvind Hægeland - vocals, keyboards
 Steinar Gundersen - lead, rhythm and acoustic guitars
 Kaj Gornitzka - rhythm guitar
 Lars K. Norberg - bass, programming
 Asgeir Mickelson - drums

 Sean Malone - stick on track 4 (guest)
 Andreas Moxnes - additional programming, midi-execution on track 4 (guest)

Production
 Neil Kernon - production, mixing, editing, recording

References

External links

1999 debut albums
Spiral Architect albums